Camptonville Union Elementary School District  is a public school district based in Yuba County, CA, United States

References

External links
 

School districts in California